Prospect Tower is a folly on the Cotehele Estate. It has three sides and is 60ft high. When the National Trust was given the Cotehele Estate in 1947 the Trust renovated the tower and constructed a wooden spiral staircase inside, to allow visitors. The Tower was last renovated in 2018 and is still open to the public.

History
Prospect Tower was built by the 2nd Earl of Mount Edgcumbe in celebration of the royal visit of King George III.

References

External links
Cotehele Website
Calstock Parish Archives

Gardens in Cornwall
Grade II listed buildings in Cornwall
National Trust properties in Cornwall
National Heritage List for England
Buildings and structures in Cornwall
Cotehele
Folly towers in England
Towers completed in 1789